Aleks Sierz is a British theatre critic. He is known for coining the term "In-yer-face theatre", which was the title of a book he published in 2001.

Sierz was educated at Manchester University and holds a PhD from Westminster University. He works as a freelance writer and has written for publications including Tribune, The Arts Desk and The Stage, as well as newspapers such as The Independent. He co-edits Theatre Voice.

He is a visiting professor at Rose Bruford College, and has been a lecturer on Boston University's "Study Abroad" programme in London.

His publications include

In-Yer-Face Theatre: British Drama Today (Faber, 2001)
The Theatre of Martin Crimp (Methuen, 2006)
John Osborne's Look Back in Anger (Continuum, 2008)
Rewriting the Nation: British Theatre Today (Methuen, 2011)

References

British theatre critics
Living people
Year of birth missing (living people)